is a Japanese professional mixed martial artist currently competing in the welterweight division. A professional competitor since 2006, he has also competed for the RIZIN, UFC, Bellator, and Pancrase.

Background
Born and raised in the Nishinari-ku district Osaka, Japan, Kunimoto was a professional skateboarder from the age of 17 until he was 24, when he began training in mixed martial arts.

Mixed martial art career

Early career
Kunimoto made his professional debut in 2006 for Pancrase, losing via knockout. However, Kunimoto would go on to compile a record of 14-5-2 with one no contest and captured the HEAT Welterweight Championship, subsequently defending his title twice, before being signed by the UFC.

Ultimate Fighting Championship
Kunimoto was originally scheduled to make his UFC debut at UFC Fight Night 34 on June 4, 2014, against Hyun Gyu Lim, but instead faced Luiz Dutra Jr. as Lim was promoted to appear in the main event. Kunimoto won via disqualification due to Dutra Jr. landing multiple elbows to the back of Kunimoto's head in the first round.

Kunimoto made his next appearance at UFC 174 on June 14, 2014, facing Daniel Sarafian. Kunimoto won via rear-naked choke submission in the first round, and earned "Performance of the Night" honors for his performance.

Kunimoto then faced Richard Walsh on September 20, 2014, at UFC Fight Night 52. He won the fight via split decision.

Kunimoto faced Neil Magny on February 14, 2015, at UFC Fight Night 60. He lost the fight via rear=naked choke submission in the third round.

Kunimoto was expected to face Li Jingliang on September 27, 2015, at UFC Fight Night 75. However, Kunimoto pulled out of the fight in late August citing injury and was replaced by returning veteran Keita Nakamura.

After an extended hiatus, Kunimoto was expected to face Warlley Alves on June 11, 2017, at UFC Fight Night 110. However, Alves pulled out of the fight on May 19 and was replaced by Zak Ottow. He lost the fight via split decision.

RIZIN Fighting Federation
Kunimoto made the move and signed with Rizin Fighting Federation. He made his against Satoru Kitaoka on December 29, 2017, at RIZIN World Grand Prix 2017: 2nd Round in a 75kg catchweight bout. Kunimoto won the fight by unanimous decision.

Bellator MMA
In April 2019, news surfaced that Kunimoto had signed a contract with Bellator MMA. In his promotional debut, Kunimoto faced Ed Ruth at Bellator 224 on July 12, 2019 and lost the fight via TKO in the second round.

As the sophomore bout of his Bellator tenure, Kunimoto was expected to face Neiman Gracie at Bellator 236 on December 21, 2019. However, Gracie had to withdraw from the bout due to an injury and was replaced by Jason Jackson. He lost the fight via unanimous decision.

Rizin FF 
Kunimoto returned to Rizin in order to face Takahiro Kawanaka on November 28, 2021 at Rizin Trigger 1. He won the bout via first-round submission.

Kunimoto then faced Daichi Abe at Rizin 34 – Osaka on March 20, 2022. He lost the fight via unanimous decision.

Personal life
Kunimoto and his fiancée have a daughter (born 2019).

Championships and accomplishments

Mixed martial arts
Heat
HEAT Welterweight Championship (One time; former)
Two successful title defenses
Ultimate Fighting Championship
Performance of the Night (One time) vs. Daniel Sarafian

Mixed martial arts record

|-
| Loss
| align=center| 20–9–2 (1)
| Daichi Abe
| Decision (unanimous)
| Rizin 34
| 
| align=center| 3
| align=center| 3:00
| Osaka, Japan
| 
|-
| Win
| align=center| 20–8–2 (1)
| Takahiro Kawanaka
| Submission (arm-triangle choke)
| Rizin Trigger 1
| 
| align=center|1
| align=center|4:10
| Kobe, Japan
|
|-
|Loss
| align=center| 19–8–2 (1)
| Jason Jackson
| Decision (unanimous)
| Bellator 236
| 
| align=center|3
| align=center|5:00
| Honolulu, Hawaii, United States
|
|-
|Loss
| align=center| 19–7–2 (1)
| Ed Ruth 
| TKO (punches)
| Bellator 224
| 
| align=center|2
| align=center|3:49
| Thackerville, Oklahoma, United States
|
|-
| Win
| align=center| 19–6–2 (1)
| Ryuichiro Sumimura
| Submission (arm-triangle choke)
|RIZIN 12
||
|align=center|1
|align=center|4:59
|Nagoya, Japan
| 
|-
| Win
| align=center| 18–6–2 (1)
|Satoru Kitaoka
| Decision (unanimous)
| RIZIN World Grand Prix 2017: Second Round
|
| align=center| 2
| align=center| 5:00
|Saitama, Japan
|
|-
|Loss
|align=center|17–6–2 (1)
|Zak Ottow
|Decision (split)
|UFC Fight Night: Lewis vs. Hunt
|
|align=center|3
|align=center|5:00
|Auckland, New Zealand
| 
|-
| Loss
| align=center|17–5–2 (1)
| Neil Magny
| Submission (rear-naked choke)
| UFC Fight Night: Henderson vs. Thatch
| 
| align=center| 3
| align=center| 1:22
| Broomfield, Colorado, United States
| 
|-
| Win
| align=center| 17–4–2 (1)
| Richard Walsh
| Decision (split)
| UFC Fight Night: Hunt vs. Nelson
| 
| align=center| 3
| align=center| 5:00
| Saitama, Japan
| 
|-
| Win
| align=center| 16–4–2 (1)
| Daniel Sarafian
| Submission (rear-naked choke)
| UFC 174
| 
| align=center| 1
| align=center| 2:52
| Vancouver, British Columbia, Canada
| 
|-
| Win
| align=center| 15–4–2 (1)
| Luiz Dutra Jr.
| DQ (illegal elbows)
| UFC Fight Night: Saffiedine vs. Lim
| 
| align=center| 1
| align=center| 2:57
| Marina Bay, Singapore
| 
|-
| Win
| align=center| 14–4–2 (1)
| Edward Faaloloto
| Submission (armbar)
| Heat: Heat 27
| 
| align=center| 1
| align=center| 1:55
| Hyogo, Japan
| 
|-
| Win
| align=center| 13–4–2 (1)
| Fumitoshi Ishikawa
| Submission (arm-triangle choke)
| Heat: Heat 26
| 
| align=center| 5
| align=center| 1:59
| Aichi, Japan
| 
|-
| Win
| align=center| 12–4–2 (1)
| Gyu Myung Lee
| Submission (shoulder choke)
| Heat: Heat 25
| 
| align=center| 1
| align=center| 4:40
| Tokyo, Japan
| 
|-
| Win
| align=center| 11–4–2 (1)
| Seong Won Son
| Decision (unanimous)
| Heat: Heat 23
| 
| align=center| 3
| align=center| 5:00
| Hyogo, Japan
| 
|-
| Loss
| align=center| 10–4–2 (1)
| Takenori Sato
| Decision (unanimous)
| Pancrase: Progress Tour 3
| 
| align=center| 3
| align=center| 5:00
| Tokyo, Japan
| 
|-
| Win
| align=center| 10–3–2 (1)
| Yu Shiroi
| Submission (guillotine choke)
| Pancrase: Impressive Tour 12
| 
| align=center| 2
| align=center| 0:40
| Osaka, Japan
| 
|-
| Win
| align=center| 9–3–2 (1)
| Kengo Ura
| Decision (unanimous)
| Pancrase: Impressive Tour 4
| 
| align=center| 3
| align=center| 5:00
| Tokyo, Japan
| 
|-
| Draw
| align=center| 8–3–2 (1)
| Seiki Ryo
| Draw
| Pancrase: Passion Tour 7
| 
| align=center| 2
| align=center| 5:00
| Tokyo, Japan
| 
|-
| Draw
| align=center| 8–3–1 (1)
| Tomoyoshi Iwamiya
| Draw
| Pancrase: Passion Tour 2
| 
| align=center| 3
| align=center| 5:00
| Osaka, Japan
| 
|-
| Win
| align=center| 8–3 (1)
| Yoshifumi Dogaki
| TKO (punches)
| Pancrase: Changing Tour 7
| 
| align=center| 2
| align=center| 0:39
| Osaka, Japan
| 
|-
| Win
| align=center| 7–3 (1)
| Hiroki Tanaka
| Decision (unanimous)
| Powergate: Octave
| 
| align=center| 2
| align=center| 5:00
| Osaka, Japan
| 
|-
| Win
| align=center| 6–3 (1)
| Shingo Suzuki
| Technical Submission (arm-triangle choke)
| Pancrase: Changing Tour 1
| 
| align=center| 1
| align=center| 3:00
| Tokyo, Japan
| 
|-
| Loss
| align=center| 5–3 (1)
| Tomoyoshi Iwamiya
| Decision (unanimous)
| Pancrase: Shining 9
| 
| align=center| 2
| align=center| 5:00
| Tokyo, Japan
| 
|-
| NC
| align=center| 5–2 (1)
| Hirotaka Yoshioka
| No Contest
| Pancrase: Shining 7
| 
| align=center| 1
| align=center| 2:10
| Osaka, Japan
| 
|-
| Win
| align=center| 5–2
| Yu Shiori
| Decision (unanimous)
| Pancrase: Shining 4
| 
| align=center| 2
| align=center| 5:00
| Osaka, Japan
| 
|-
| Loss
| align=center| 4–2
| Sotaro Yamada
| Submission (rear-naked choke)
| Pancrase: Shining 1
| 
| align=center| 1
| align=center| 1:42
| Tokyo, Japan
| 
|-
| Win
| align=center| 4–1
| Yuta Nakamura
| TKO (punches)
| Pancrase: Rising 7
| 
| align=center| 1
| align=center| 2:37
| Osaka, Japan
| 
|-
| Win
| align=center| 3–1
| Mike O'Malley
| Submission (triangle choke)
| FCC 30: Freestyle Combat Challenge 30
| 
| align=center| 1
| align=center| 2:33
| Kenosha, Wisconsin, United States
| 
|-
| Win
| align=center| 2–1
| Tim Ager
| Submission (armbar)
| FCC 29: Freestyle Combat Challenge 29
| 
| align=center| 1
| align=center| N/A
| Kenosha, Wisconsin, United States
| 
|-
| Loss
| align=center| 1–1
| Masahiro Toryu
| Decision (majority)
| Pancrase: Rising 1
| 
| align=center| 2
| align=center| 5:00
| Osaka, Japan
| 
|-
| Win
| align=center| 1–0
| Arito Kishimoto
| Decision (majority)
| Double R: 3rd Stage
| 
| align=center| 1
| align=center| 5:00
| Osaka, Japan
| 
|-

Amateur mixed martial arts record

|-
| Win
| align=center| 1–1
| Teruyoshi Aoyama
| Submission (arm-triangle choke)
| Pancrase: Blow 8
| 
| align=center| 2
| align=center| 2:58
| Osaka, Japan
| 
|-
| Loss
| align=center| 0–1
| Masahiro Toryu
| KO (head kick)
| Pancrase: Blow 2
| 
| align=center| 1
| align=center| 0:05
| Osaka, Japan
| 
|}

See also
List of male mixed martial artists

References

External links

Living people
1981 births
Japanese male mixed martial artists
Japanese practitioners of Brazilian jiu-jitsu
Welterweight mixed martial artists
Mixed martial artists utilizing Brazilian jiu-jitsu
Sportspeople from Osaka
Zainichi Korean people
Ultimate Fighting Championship male fighters